Sonino is a village in Zaoksky District of Tula Oblast, Russia.

References

Rural localities in Tula Oblast